Esenler is a village in Tarsus  district of Mersin Province, Turkey. At    it is situated in Çukurova (Cilicia of the antiquity) plains to the south of Turkish state highway . It is almost merged to Yenice  municipality. The population of Esenler  was 486  as of 2012.

References

Villages in Tarsus District